Max Hermans (born 1974) is a Dutch former politician who served as a member of the House of Representatives of the Netherlands for the Lijst Pim Fortuyn (LPF).

Hermans' father served as the People's Party for Freedom and Democracy Mayor of Hulsberg. He was elected to parliament in 2003 for the LPF and was a spokesman for the portfolio of Transport, Public Works and Water Management. He held this role until 2006 after which he retired from office.

References 

Pim Fortuyn List politicians
21st-century Dutch politicians
1974 births
People from Geleen

Living people